Paul Fentener van Vlissingen (21 March 1941 in Utrecht – 21 August 2006 in Langbroek) was a Dutch businessman and philanthropist. Ranked as the richest man in Scotland in 2005, he contributed to the development of game reserves in Africa and bought Letterewe estate in Scotland, where he pledged the right to roam, years ahead of the rest of the country.

Early life
Paul Fentener van Vlissingen was the youngest son of Frits Fentener van Vlissingen II, one of the leading Dutch industrialist families whose fortune was based on shipping coal on the Rhine in the 19th century. Frits III, his eldest brother, died in March 2006. John, the middle brother, is the last alive. Paul inherited a significant shareholding in the company SHV Holdings from his father, Frits II, whose own father had co-founded the business through a merger with eight other Dutch trading families in 1896. Paul's father, described as one of the "fathers of the Dutch economy", later bought out most of the other families.

SHV Holdings 
Paul Fentener van Vlissingen studied economics at the University of Groningen before joining SHV. Originally Europe's largest coal wholesaling business, SHV is the largest privately owned company in the Netherlands. In May 1974, he joined the SHV board, and succeeded his brother, Frits, as chairman in 1980.

Paul led SHV as chief executive officer for three decades from the mid-1960s. Under his leadership, the company diversified into new areas ahead of the collapse of the coal market in the 1960s. The areas he became involved with included retail – through the Makro and Otto Reichelt chains of grocery supermarkets and cash & carries – and energy – through the acquisitions of LPG companies, including Calor Gas in the UK and Primagaz in France. He also diversified into scrap metal, recycling, oil exploration, renewable energy and private equity. In 1995 he stepped down and then served as non-executive chairman.

Fentener van Vlissingen had a maverick leadership style and was more philosophical than most business leaders. For example, he recognised the possibility of the existence of global warming as early as the early 1990s and had a love for cryptic aphorisms. He allowed young managers whom he trusted to establish Makro operations in overseas markets, giving them unusual amounts of autonomy.

Philanthropy and conservation 
Fentener Van Vlissingen was recognised as an enlightened conservationist and contributed to the development of game reserves in Scotland, South Africa, Malawi, Zambia and Ethiopia. In 1978 he bought the wild and roadless  Letterewe estate in Wester Ross, and in 2006 was described as the largest foreign landowner in Scotland. "I don't call myself the owner," he said of Letterewe. "You can't own a place like this. It belongs to the planet. I'm only the guardian of it."

An obituary in The Independent said that van Vlissingen sometimes saddled a pony with a week's provisions and disappeared into the hills, staying at a bothy without lights or a toilet. The obituary said: "He was in the habit of inviting everyone, whether landowners, journalists, birdwatchers or ramblers, to visit the estate and talk about issues face to face."

He also proposed reintroducing wolves and lynx to this estate. The Letterewe Accord, an agreement that gave ramblers freedom of access to the entire Letterewe estate in exchange for a pledge to respect the land, predated the Scottish Parliament's own right-to-roam legislation by over a decade. Van Vlissingen was also a great supporter of Scottish Gaelic, and donated £250,000 to Sabhal Mòr Ostaig, a Gaelic college on Skye.

From 1994 until his death, his home was the Conholt Park estate in Wiltshire, England, on the border with Hampshire. Here too he applied sustainable land management and nature conservation.

The Sunday Times Rich List 2005 ranked Van Vlissingen as the richest man in Scotland, with an estimated wealth of £1.1 billion.

After a near fatal brush with non-Hodgkin lymphoma in 1980, he founded the Van Vlissingen Cancer Fund, which is now one of the major cancer fundraisers in the Netherlands.

Entrepreneurs are Jackasses 
In 2001 he wrote a book entitled Ondernemers zijn ezels, which can be translated as Entrepreneurs are Jackasses. In this book he discussed his experiences directing a large multi-national conglomerate. He followed this up in 2002 with a book entitled Overstekende ezels, translated as Crossing Jackasses. In this he discusses his views regarding entrepreneurs, corruption, ambition, the euro, money, honesty, change and success.

Deathbed warning for the planet 
In April 2006, van Vlissingen announced that he had terminal pancreatic cancer and that he would not be having chemotherapy. He said: "In the Western world we mistakenly try to keep death at bay. I look to Native Americans instead. When they see their death approaching, they visit good friends and family to share happy memories and look back at the good things."

In an interview with the Dutch newspaper De Telegraaf published in April 2006, he said: "Our planet is in a much sorrier state than it was when I was a child. The destruction cannot go on at this pace. My generation should be ashamed of the condition in which we are passing on our planet to future generations."

In August 2006, the cancer got worse, and this led to his death on the night of 20–21 August 2006. The information of his death was released to the public on 22 August. Many broadcasters stated (wrongly) that Fentener van Vlissingen was the middle of the three Van Vlissingen brothers. In fact, Paul was the youngest.

Unorthodox to the last 
In February 2006 it emerged that in his will Fentener van Vlissingen left a significant portion of his estate to his partner, the former Guardian art critic Caroline Tisdall, as well as several million to his lover Suzanne Wolff. The Scotsman reported that Tisdall had been prepared to tolerate the billionaire's relationship with Wolff in his latter years. He left the bulk of his fortune and the Letterewe Estate in north-west Scotland to his two daughters, Alicia and Tet and to their children.

Footnotes

1941 births
2006 deaths
20th-century Dutch businesspeople
Deaths from pancreatic cancer
Businesspeople from Utrecht (city)
Deaths from cancer in the Netherlands
Dutch billionaires
Dutch expatriates in Scotland